The 2003 J&S Cup was a Tier II event on the 2003 WTA Tour that run from April 28 - May 4, 2003. It was held in Warsaw, Poland, and was the 8th year that the event was staged. Amélie Mauresmo of France won her first Warsaw title and first overall of the year.

Entrants

Seeds

 Seedings are based on the rankings of April 21, 2003.
 Conchita Martínez withdrew due to a right shoulder injury, so Elena Likhovtseva became the No. 9 seed, but she also withdrew due to illness, so Tatiana Panova of Russia become No. 10 seed.

Other entrants
The following players received wildcards into the main draw:

  Marta Domachowska
  Joanna Sakowicz

The following players received entry from the qualifying draw:

  Sandra Kleinová
  Zuzana Ondrášková
  Arantxa Parra
  Martina Suchá

The following players received entry as lucky losers:

  Katalin Marosi
  Renata Voráčová

Finals

Singles

 Amélie Mauresmo defeated  Venus Williams, 6-7(6), 6-0, 3-0, Ret.

Doubles

 Liezel Huber /  Magdalena Maleeva defeated  Eleni Daniilidou /  Gisela Dulko, 3-6, 6-4, 6-2

External links
WTA profile
WTA tournament draws

JandS Cup
Warsaw Open
April 2003 sports events in Europe
May 2003 sports events in Europe
War